"Key West (Philosopher Pirate)" is a song written and performed by the American singer-songwriter Bob Dylan and released as the ninth track on his 2020 album Rough and Rowdy Ways. It is a mid-tempo, accordion-driven ballad that has been cited as a high point of the album by many critics.

It is the only song on the album to feature a traditional chorus and one of only two songs (the other being "I've Made Up My Mind to Give Myself to You") to feature backing vocals.

Background and composition 

An article in Keys Weekly remarked upon how the song appeared to be written with an "insider's knowledge" of Key West, Florida, as the lyrics reference "landmarks Mallory Square and Bayview Park as well as the island city's Amelia Street and storied history: 'Truman had his [winter] White House there'". The article also quotes Joe Faber, the owner of Captain Tony's Saloon, who said that Dylan used to "come in here, sit and hang out” when the venue was owned by the city's "colorful former mayor" Tony Tarracino. As a result, the bar contains a stool with Dylan's name painted on it.

Historian Douglas Brinkley confirmed that Dylan, who was "very good friends" with Key West resident and fellow songwriter Shel Silverstein, has frequented Key West "off and on throughout his life". Dylan has also expressed enthusiasm for the songwriting of Jimmy Buffett, one of Key West's most famous residents, covering "A Pirate Looks at Forty" in concert and citing the songs "Death of an Unpopular Poet" and "He Went to Paris" as his favorite Buffett compositions in an interview.

"Key West" is actually the second song Dylan has written about the Florida Keys. He wrote the lyrics to the first, "Florida Key", in 1967, although the words were not set to music and recorded until the song was completed by Taylor Goldsmith for The New Basement Tapes project in 2014. Both "Florida Key" and "Key West" contain a verbal play on "key", using the word to connote both the name of a geographical place as well as a device for unlocking something (e.g., "Nothing's locked, never will be" in the earlier song and "Key West is the gateway key to innocence and purity" in the later one).

In addition to the then-current members of Bob Dylan's touring band, "Key West" features Benmont Tench on Hammond organ. Some critics have compared the music to Dylan's melancholy 1989 love song "Most of the Time". The song is performed in the key of C major.

Themes
One of the main ideas driving the song is the way Dylan posits Key West simultaneously as a concrete place on earth as well as a metaphor for some kind of heavenly afterlife ("Key West is the place to be / If you're looking for immortality"). Since it is about someone traveling to Key West (e.g., "Stay on the road, follow the highway sign"), the song has been interpreted by many critics as having a spiritual aspect, with the word "liminal" frequently being invoked to describe the sense that its narrator is transitioning from one place to another. An article in GQ by Charlie Burton and Bill Prince, for instance, notes that, "A sense of liminality, not quite being one place or another, pervades this work", and cites the line "Key West is on the horizon line" as an example.

Dylan scholar Kevin Saylor elaborates on this conceit by comparing "Key West" to Dylan's 1997 song "Highlands", which he claims likewise takes place in a "liminal space" that the narrator calls "home even though he currently is far away...'Key West' plays a similar role. It is described as 'the place to be', 'fine and fair', 'on the horizon line', 'the place to go', 'the gateway key', 'the enchanted land', 'the land of light', and 'paradise divine'. Clearly, Key West is a place set apart from and superior to all other locales in which the rest of the songs on Rough and Rowdy Ways are set. The singer of 'Key West', released 23 years after 'Highlands', is closer to his final destination than the singer of the earlier song. 'Highlands' ends: 'Well, my heart’s in the Highlands at the break of day / Over the hills and far away / There’s a way to get there and I’ll figure it out somehow / But I’m already there in my mind / And that’s good enough for now'. In the new song, he is already in Key West, the borderline city on the horizon, the place of passage to our ultimate goal".

In his book Determined to Stand: The Reinvention of Bob Dylan, Chris Gregory interprets the verse about the narrator, at age 12, being "forced ... to marry a prostitute" as a metaphor for Dylan's relationship with Judaism. Gregory notes that Dylan's bar mitzvah occurred shortly before his 13th birthday and that the line "There were gold fringes on her wedding dress" may refer to "the decorations often traditionally attached to the Torah itself". Gregory sees the lines "That's my story but not where it ends / She's still cute and we're still friends" as further referencing Judaism, "a religion [Dylan] seems to have been ‘forced’ to adhere to as a boy but which he still seems to have some lingering affection for".

Critical reception 
Rolling Stone ranked "Key West" the second best song of 2020 (behind only Cardi B and Megan Thee Stallion's "WAP") and placed it seventh on a list of "The 25 Best Bob Dylan Songs of the 21st Century". In an article accompanying the latter list, music journalist Rob Sheffied extrapolated from the impressionistic lyrics a narrative about "a grizzled outlaw, hiding out in Florida, hounded by his memories". Hyperallergics Lucas Fagen wrote that, "in a voice drunk on blood and sunshine, Dylan sings a rapturous, almost operatic ode to the island, going overboard in his praise" but notes that the song "resonates thanks to the specificity and absurdity of its conceit" and calls it "emotionally direct and weirdly moving".

Among the reviewers who have cited it as the high point of Rough and Rowdy Ways are the New Yorker's Amanda Petrusich, who called it "Shakespearean" for its lyrical richness and complexity, and Anne Margaret Daniel at Hot Press, who wrote that "'Key West (Philosopher Pirate)' is what I'd take to my desert island[.]"

Authors Adam Selzer and Michael Glover Smith have drawn thematic parallels between "Key West" and Harold Arlen and Yip Harburg's "Over the Rainbow" and Dylan's own "Murder Most Foul", respectively. Smith also praised Donnie Herron's accordion playing on the track, which he cites as "the aural personification of a gentle Florida breeze, warmly embodying the 'healing virtues of the wind' that Dylan so memorably sings about". Historian Douglas Brinkley, who conducted the only interview with Dylan to coincide with the release of Rough and Rowdy Ways, described the song as "a beautiful piece of art", adding that "Dylan knows it's my favorite on the CD".

Spectrum Culture included the song on a list of "Bob Dylan's 20 Best Songs of the '10s and Beyond". In an article accompanying the list, critic Kevin Korber praises the "dreamlike" lyrics, in which he sees Dylan looking "beyond the realm in which we currently live... As Dylan approaches his eighties, it’s only fair that he would start thinking of what comes next, and 'Key West' could be the great singer coming to grips with what a paradise in the afterlife could be with only his terrestrial experiences to interpret from. Even so, he seems far from confident in his projections, perhaps understanding that these good times in this Florida resort town could be the best that life has to offer".

The Big Issue placed it at #8 on a 2021 list of the "80 best Bob Dylan songs - that aren't the greatest hits" and called it a "[g]loriously meandering masterpiece from his latest album". A 2021 Guardian article included it on a list of "80 Bob Dylan songs everyone should know".

Cultural references 
The song's opening words, "McKinley hollered, McKinley squalled", refer to the opening of Charlie Poole's 1926 song "White House Blues", which describes the assassination of President William McKinley. It is ambiguous as to whether Dylan means for the narrator of "Key West" to be listening to the song "White House Blues" or the actual assassination of McKinley via a magical radio. Dylan may have been aware that the first wireless radio transmission was sent across the Atlantic Ocean in 1901, the same year as McKinley's assassination. McKinley also had a specific connection to Key West: His signature foreign policy achievement as President was victory in the Spanish–American War. When the United States became involved in that conflict, Key West was the embarkation point for U.S. troops (under the command of General William Rufus Shafter).

In the second verse, the song's narrator identifies himself with a trio of famous Beat Generation writers: Allen Ginsberg, Gregory Corso and Jack Kerouac. It is likely not a coincidence that Ginsberg, who was close friends with Dylan, once wrote a poem titled "Walking at Night in Key West".

Given the references to classical antiquity elsewhere on Rough and Rowdy Ways, the line "Got my right hand high with the thumb down" is likely an allusion to the belief that a Roman emperor giving a thumbs-down signal at a gladiatorial fight meant "swords down" (i.e., that a losing fighter was to be spared, not killed). This may even be a reference to Julius Caesar who is referred to more explicitly on two of the album's other tracks ("My Own Version of You" and "Crossing the Rubicon").

The line "I've never lived in the land of Oz" refers to the magical country created by L. Frank Baum in his 1900 children's book The Wonderful Wizard of Oz and popularized in the 1939 MGM film The Wizard of Oz. Another line in the same verse, "The tiny blossoms of a toxic plant / They can make you dizzy - I’d like to help ya but I can’t", likely refers to a scene (in the novel and film) where the protagonist, Dorothy Gale, is intoxicated by the scent of flowers in a "deadly poppy field". 

The line "I'm not that far from the convent home" in the fourth verse is likely a reference to the Convent of Mary Immaculate located on Truman Avenue in Key West. According to the Library of Congress: "The Convent of Mary Immaculate is the oldest educational institution in Southern Florida. The school opened in 1869 and has been located in the present building since 1875. The building is an excellent example of late nineteenth century architecture designed for religious purposes and serving both the living needs of its occupants and the educational needs of the larger community".

As with several other songs on Rough and Rowdy Ways (notably "I Contain Multitudes" and "Murder Most Foul"), Dylan seamlessly incorporates the titles of other popular songs into the lyrics of "Key West". Chief among them are "Down in the Boondocks", "Try a Little Tenderness", "I Don't Love Nobody" and "Fly Around My Pretty Little Miss".

Live performances
"Key West" received its live debut at the Riverside Theater in Milwaukee, Wisconsin on November 2, 2021, the first concert of Dylan's Rough and Rowdy Ways World Wide Tour. In a Rolling Stone review, critic Andy Greene identified the performance as the "high point" of the show.

Accolades

References

External links

Lyrics at Bob Dylan's official site

2020 songs
2020s ballads
Bob Dylan songs
Songs written by Bob Dylan